Dave Askren is an American jazz guitarist and educator.

Musical career
Askren was born in Milwaukee, Wisconsin, but he grew up in Raleigh, North Carolina, and Dayton, Ohio, son of a church organist/piano teacher. He learned about jazz from local musicians whose interests went beyond rock and blues. Askren started on clarinet and saxophone, but switched to guitar when he was fourteen. In his early teens he belonged to professional bands that played rock, blues, and R&B at local venues. From 1976–1980, he attended Berklee College of Music in Boston and taught there during the 1980s, while playing gigs around Boston. He also worked with Delfeayo Marsalis, Antonio Hart, Kevin Eubanks, Hendrik Meurkens, and Bob Moses.

In the 1990s, he moved to Los Angeles and was a sideman for pop acts such as La Toya Jackson and Marilyn McCoo. During his career, he has also worked with David King, Bobby Shew, Jimmy Branly, Sal Cracciolo, Gary Foster, Linda Hopkins, Eddie Resto.

Discography
 Re: Bill Evans (String Jazz, 2002)
 Rhubumba (Sea Breeze, 2004)
 Some Other Things (Sea Breeze, 2005)
 Trio Nuevo + (Daway, 2008)
 It's All About the Groove with Jeff Benedict (Daway, 2013)
 Among Friends with the Orion Saxophone Quartet (Tapestry, 2013)
 Holmes with the Jeff benedict Big Band (Tapestry, 2015)
 Come Together with Jeff Benedict (Tapestry, 2017)
 Paraphernalia -  Music of Wayne Shorter with Jeff Benedict (Tapestry, 2020)

References

4. Cook, Richard & Morton, Brian (2008). The Penguin Guide To Jazz Recordings 9th Edition. London: pp 48–49. .

External links
 Official site

Living people
American jazz guitarists
Musicians from Milwaukee
Berklee College of Music faculty
Year of birth missing (living people)